Franklin & Marshall College (F&M) is a private liberal arts college in Lancaster, Pennsylvania. It employs 175 full-time faculty members and has a student body of approximately 2,400 full-time students. It was founded upon the merger of Franklin College and Marshall College, in 1853.

The college offers various majors and minors across 62 fields of study, across the humanities, social sciences, natural sciences, and other disciplines. The college also operates an advanced studies program in Bath, England. Its most popular majors, by 2021 graduates, were:
Multi-/Interdisciplinary Studies (100)
Business Administration & Management (57)
Economics (41)
Biology/Biological Sciences (39)
Political Science & Government (36)
Behavioral Sciences (32)

All of the college's 2,254 students are undergraduates, and nearly all live on campus. The college has some notable alumni, including a Pulitzer Prize winner, and is a top producer of Fulbright Fellows.

Statistics

Rankings and reputation 
In the U.S. News & World Report annual college rankings for 2022, Franklin and Marshall College tied for 42nd in National Liberal Arts Colleges, 44th in Best Undergraduate Teaching, 98th in Top Performers on Social Mobility, and ranked 31st in Best Value Schools. In the similar Forbes rankings, Franklin and Marshall ranked 134th in overall top colleges, 74th in private colleges, 29th in Liberal Arts Universities, and 54th in the Northeast. Washington Monthly ranked Franklin and Marshall 35th in their list of Liberal Arts Colleges.

Admissions 
Franklin and Marshall's admissions process is rated as "more selective" by U.S. News & World Report. For the class of 2025, F&M received 7,720 applications and had an acceptance rate of 38%.

History

Franklin College (18th century)
Franklin College was chartered on June 6, 1787, in Lancaster, Pennsylvania, on the site of a former brewery. It was named for Benjamin Franklin, who donated £200 to the new institution. Founded by four prominent ministers from the German Reformed Church and the Lutheran Church, in conjunction with numerous Philadelphians, the school was established as a German college whose goal was "to preserve our present republican system of government," and "to promote those improvements in the arts and sciences which alone render nations respectable, great and happy." Its first trustees included five signers of the Declaration of Independence, two members of the Constitutional Convention and seven officers of the Revolutionary War.

The school's first classes were taught on July 16, 1787, with instruction taking place in both English and German, making it the first bilingual college in the United States.

The first class consisted of 78 men and 36 women; Franklin was the first college in the United States to accept female students. "However, the coed policy was soon abandoned. Coeducation was not revived at the College for another 182 years."

In July 1789, Franklin College went into debt because its annual tuition of four pounds was not enough to cover operating costs. Enrollment dwindled to just a few students and eventually the college existed as nothing more than an annual meeting of the board of trustees. In an effort to help the ailing school, an academy was established in 1807. For the next three decades, Franklin College and Franklin Academy managed to limp along financially, with instructors supplementing their income with private tutoring.

Marshall College (19th century)
Having grown from a Reformed Church academy, Marshall College opened in 1836 in Mercersburg, Pennsylvania. The school was named for the fourth Chief Justice of the United States John Marshall, who had died the previous year. It was founded with the belief that harmony between knowledge and will was necessary to create a well-rounded person.

During its first year, 18 students were taught by Frederick Augustus Rauch and his assistant, Samuel A. Budd. Rauch, an acclaimed young scholar and theologian from Germany who authored the first American textbook in psychology, also served as the college's president.

The school's small faculty grew in both size and status with the addition of John Williamson Nevin and another German scholar, church historian Philip Schaff. Nevin became the college's president upon Rauch's sudden death in 1841.

Life at Marshall College was regimented. Students were required to attend morning prayers—sometimes as early as 5 a.m.—and were expected to study in their rooms for six hours a day. In addition, they were forbidden to associate with people of questionable moral character.

Marshall College quickly gained national recognition and attracted students from a large geographical area, with some coming as far away as the West Indies. However, despite being initially well-funded, Marshall College began to experience financial difficulties of its own. By the late 1840s, financial support and enthusiasm among the local community had virtually disappeared and the school was in danger of closing its doors permanently.

In 1835, the school's Debating Society was renamed Diagnothian Literary Society at the suggestion of seminary student Samuel Reed Fisher. That June, Diagnothian was divided into two friendly rivals to encourage debate. Diagnothian retained its original name, while the new society was named Goethean, in honor of German philosopher and poet Johann Wolfgang von Goethe. The two organizations sponsored orations and debated politics, philosophy and literature. They merged in 1955, but became separate entities again in 1989. The Diagnothian Society is the oldest student organization on campus.

Merger
On December 6, 1849, Franklin College and Marshall College began to consider merging as a way to secure the future of both institutions. Three years later, on June 7, 1853, the combined college was formally dedicated at Lancaster's Fulton Hall. The merger created an all-male Reformed Church institution that combined the resources of both schools. James Buchanan, four years prior to becoming the 15th President of the United States, was named president of the first Franklin & Marshall board of trustees.

The college's first two presidents, Emanuel Vogel Gerhart, a Marshall College graduate, and Nevin struggled to keep the young school afloat with an inadequate endowment. The hope of creating a reputable liberal arts institution fueled their efforts to push on. "No second- or third-rate school will do," said Nevin at the formal dedication of the united college. "We must either have no college at all or else have one that may be in all respects worthy of the name."

The citizens of Lancaster agreed to donate $25,000 towards the construction of a building for the merged college.  A site on the east end of the city was proposed near where the new Lancaster County Prison was constructed in 1851.  Two parallel streets in the area were renamed, one for Franklin and one for Marshall.  However, Buchanan ultimately rejected the proposal, saying "I do not think the best location for a literary institution should be between a court house and a jail."  Instead, Buchanan and the board selected a site at the northwestern end of Lancaster.  Known locally as  "Gallows Hill," it was the former site of Lancaster's public executions and the highest point of ground in city. At the laying of the building's cornerstone in 1853, Henry Harbaugh, a Marshall College graduate and pastor of the Reformed Church of Lancaster noted that the city's lowest point was the prison. Harbaugh stated: "Thank God! The College stands higher than the jail. Education should be lifted up and let crime sink to the lowest depths!"  The distinctive, tall-towered structure, designed in the Gothic Revival style, was dedicated on May 16, 1856, as "Recitation Hall."  Recitation Hall came to be known as "Old Main" and the ground as "College Hill".

Franklin and Marshall College took as its motto the Latin phrase Lux et Lex, which translates in English to "Light and Law". This reversed the Marshall College motto Lex et Lux. While legend has it that the switch was the result of an error by an engraver, it has since been suggested that the words deliberately reflect its namesakes Benjamin Franklin ("light") and John Marshall ("law").

The college seal depicts profiles of Franklin and Marshall looking to the left. It has been suggested that this represents the two leaders looking westward to the future expansion of the United States. Despite his nominal secondary priority, John Marshall is on the left of the seal and Benjamin Franklin is on the right. But Franklin's entire head is shown, while Marshall's profile is cut off and far in the background. Speculation has suggested that this demonstrates an unspoken tendency to favor Franklin's legacy over Marshall's. This preference became explicit when the school celebrated Benjamin Franklin's 300th birthday but ignored John Marshall's 250th birthday during consecutive semesters of the 2005–2006 academic year. The school recognized Marshall's milestone birthday only after a petition was signed by a significant portion of students and faculty.

Old Main, Goethean Hall, and Diagnothian Hall were added to the National Register of Historic Places in 1975.

Late 19th century

In 1872, the Franklin and Marshall Academy, an all-male prep school, opened on campus. When it closed in 1943, it was the last prep school in America to be directly affiliated with a private college or university. The academy's first building, East Hall, was constructed in 1872. A second and larger building, Hartman Hall, replaced it in 1907. Both buildings were used by the college after the academy folded. Hartman Hall was demolished in 1975 followed by East Hall in 1978.

College Days, the first student newspaper, began publication in 1873. Later student newspapers included The College Student (1881–1914), The F&M Weekly (1891–1915), The Student Weekly (1915–1964), The Blue and The White (1990–1992), and The College Reporter (1964–present).

Oriflamme, the Franklin and Marshall College yearbook, was established in 1883.

In 1887, the centennial celebration of Franklin College was held. By then, over 100 students were enrolled at F&M.

1899 saw the formation of the college's first theatre group, the Franklin & Marshall Dramatic Association. The next year, it was renamed the Green Room Club. The club performed plays at Lancaster's Fulton Opera House. Because the college admitted only men, the female roles were played by local actresses. In 1937, the Green Room Theatre opened on campus. F&M alumni who have performed on the Green Room stage include Oscar-winning film director Franklin J. Schaffner and actors Roy Scheider and Treat Williams.

20th century

The college grew rapidly after World War I. Enrollment rose from around 300 students in 1920, to over 750 by 1930. In 1924, the architectural firm of Klauder and Day presented a master campus plan in the Colonial Revival style. Dietz-Santee dormitory, Meyran-Franklin dormitory, the Mayser Physical Education Center, and Hensel Hall were all completed within three years. Two additional dormitories were planned, but never constructed.

The sesquicentennial celebration of Franklin College was held in October 1937. Student enrollment by then was 800. A commemorative plaque celebrating the sesquicentennial and the signing of the United States Constitution was presented to the college by the Lancaster County Historical Society.

In 1939, the school began an aviation program in the new Keiper Liberal Arts Building. The Aeronautical Laboratory eventually became a government-sponsored flight school with 40 faculty members. Two airplanes were disassembled, moved into the building and reassembled on the third floor as flight simulators.

During World War II, Franklin and Marshall College was one of 131 colleges and universities that adopted the V-12 Navy College Training Program offering students a path to a Navy commission.

By 1945, with most young men in the armed services, the college population dwindled to just under 500 students and 28 faculty members. The end of the war brought an influx of students pursuing degrees under the G.I. Bill. By 1946, enrollment had swelled to over 1,200 students (including four women in the pre-med program), causing a sudden critical shortage of faculty.

The 1950s and 1960s brought more college expansion and construction, including North Museum (1953); Marshall-Buchanan Residence Hall (1956), Appel Infirmary (1959), Schnader Residence Hall (1959), Mayser Physical Education Center (1962), Benjamin Franklin Residence Halls (1964), Pfeiffer Science Complex (now Hackman Physical Science Laboratory) (1967), Grundy Observatory (1967), Whitely Psychology Laboratory (1968), and Thomas Residence Hall (1968).

Like other academic institutions in the 1960s, Franklin and Marshall endured student protests during the Civil Rights Movement and the Vietnam War. In April 1961, students rioted in front of the President's house and Hensel Hall, burning effigies and college property in protest of administration policies.

Martin Luther King Jr. visited the campus on December 12, 1963, three weeks after the assassination of John F. Kennedy, and spoke on civil rights to an overflow crowd of more than 4,000 in Mayser Center, the school's gymnasium.

In 1965 Robert Mezey, a 30-year-old visiting English instructor and poet, spoke on campus against the Vietnam War, and traveled to Washington, DC to march against the conflict. When he was accused of urging students to burn their draft cards, he was suspended with pay for a month while the college investigated. The incident generated controversy in the local press, with some residents ordering him to "get the hell out of Lancaster" and "go to Russia." Though Mezey was reinstated, he left the college the following spring. This became known as the "Mezey Affair."

In the spring of 1969, black students protested the final examination of the history course "The Black Experience in America." Demanding an apology from the faculty for exploitation and an "A" in the course, the students argued that no white man can test them on their "blackness." The day before the exam, the professors agreed to the apology, but insisted that the students take the final exam. On May 22, the day of the exam, 40 black students—many of whom were not enrolled in the course—blocked the entrance to the exam room in Old Main. The professors attempted to hand out the exam, but the protesters confiscated them. Retreating to Goethean Hall next door, the professors and staff met to evaluate the situation. The protesters followed them to the building, blocked all doors and exits and held them hostage, declaring that they would not release the faculty members until they received an apology and immunity from punishment. The standoff lasted until midnight, when the professors agreed to allow the students to grade themselves. The students relented and released the hostages. The college's Professional Standards Committee later overturned the decision, declaring that the professors must grade their students.

In 1969, Franklin and Marshall College ended its formal affiliation with the United Church of Christ, becoming a secular school.

Franklin College had enrolled female students during its first few years in the eighteenth century, to its academy for teenagers. Franklin and Marshall College was an all-male institution. Women were permitted to attend summer school classes at F&M beginning in 1942. Continuing a trend at gender exclusive schools across the country, the Board of Trustees announced on January 17, 1969, that it had voted to admit women to F&M, a decision that was supported by male students. In the fall of 1969, 82 freshman women and 34 female transfer students were enrolled in F&M's first coeducational class.

In 1970, F&M students protested the administration's failure to rehire popular sociology instructor Anthony Lazroe and history instructor Henry Mayer. The protest, known as the "Lazroe-Mayer incident," culminated in an East Hall sit-in on April 30, where students took over the building for several hours.

On September 17, 1970, the Herman Art Center (named after Jacob Leon Herman, Class of 1916) was dedicated as part of Convocation, during which painter Jim Dine and sculptor Chaim Gross were awarded honorary degrees. The building was designed by Fisher, Nes and Campbell of Baltimore, MD, for the studio art program, but only half of the original design was constructed due to lack of funds.

In 1976, the Steinman College Center was constructed. The building—designed by Minoru Yamasaki, architect of New York's World Trade Center—originally housed the campus bookstore. Today it houses the College Reporter, the Oriflamme Yearbook, the College Entertainment Committee, the Phillips Museum of Art, Pandini's (a restaurant), the campus radio station WFNM, and a post office.

On April 29, 1976, the Green Room Theatre staged the world premiere of the John Updike play Buchanan Dying, about former President James Buchanan, a Lancaster resident and former president of the board of trustees. The production was directed by Edward S. Brubaker and starred Peter Vogt, an F&M alumnus. After the premiere, a reception was held at Wheatland, Buchanan's Lancaster residence.

On March 28, 1979, the Three Mile Island nuclear reactor in nearby Harrisburg, Pennsylvania, experienced a partial meltdown, forcing the college to close briefly.

The college prospered during the 1980s. Construction projects initiated during the decade included Hartman Green (1982), French House (1984), Murray Arts House (1984), Ice Rink (1984), Spaulding Plaza (1985), and the Other Room Theatre (1985). Major renovations and expansions included Fackenthal Library (1983, renamed Shadek-Fackenthal Library, currently over 510,000 volumes), Stahr Hall (1985, renamed Stager Hall, 1988), the Black Cultural Center (1986), and Weis Residence Hall (1989).

On June 6, 1987, Franklin and Marshall College celebrated its bicentennial.

The 1990s brought a major expansion to the north side of campus with the construction of College Square in 1991. The multi-use complex houses a bookstore, laundromat, video store, restaurants and a food court. Other buildings from the decade include International House (1990), Martin Library of the Sciences (1990, currently over 61,000 volumes), and the Alumni Sports and Fitness Center (1995).

21st century

At the start of the 21st century, the college continued to grow with the addition of the Barshinger Center for Musical Arts in Hensel Hall (2000), President's House (built 1933, purchased by the college in 2002), Roschel Performing Arts Center (2003), Writer's House (2004), College Row Apartments (2007) which included apartment style living for upper-classmen with retail space on ground floors, the renovated Klehr Center for Jewish life (2008), and the Ann & Richard Barshinger Life Sciences & Philosophy Building (2007).

In 2003, the National Park Service established the Franklin and Marshall College Campus Historic District, listing 14 buildings (including Old Main, Goethean Hall, and Diagnothian Hall, previously listed in 1975) and three architectural features.

On January 19, 2006, the college celebrated the tricentennial of Benjamin Franklin's birth. Franklin scholar Walter Isaacson gave a lecture, and a full-page ad praising Franklin and promoting the college was purchased in The New York Times.

On March 10, 2010, it was announced that then current president John Fry would be leaving the college to become the president of Drexel University on August 1, 2010. The college immediately began a search for a new president for the fall semester. Alumnus John Burness took a one-year leave from his job at Duke University as senior vice president for public affairs and government relations to head the college as interim president.

On November 16, 2010, Daniel R. Porterfield was announced as the new president, effective March 1, 2011. Porterfield came to F&M from Georgetown University in Washington, D.C., where he served as a senior vice president. He became the 15th president in the college's history.

Since 2011 hundreds of talented, underserved high school students from across the country have taken part in F&M College Prep, a summer immersion program that offers an introduction to college life. Each of these participants have gone on to college, and more than 90% have gone on to enroll at four-year colleges, including Harvard, Brown, Stanford, Georgetown, and Bucknell universities, the University of Texas-Austin, Pomona College, Trinity College, Spelman College, and Franklin & Marshall. The Office of Student and Post-Graduate Development offering life skills workshops, job-search boot camps for seniors and recent grads, on-campus recruiting and alumni programming, opened in 2012 and enjoys wide support from students and alumni. The Andrew W. Mellon Foundation awarded F&M a $700,000 grant for its Faculty Center, which was launched in 2013 to improve support for faculty in their roles as researchers and educators.

On May 1, 2014, Franklin & Marshall College was named as one of 55 colleges under review or investigation by the U.S. Department of Education's Office for Civil Rights, for their policies or practices for handling sexual assault reports. Prior to the public announcement, President Porterfield sent an email to address the impending OCR "fact-finding investigation."

Presidents
Franklin College:
Gotthilf Heinrich Ernst Muhlenberg (1787–1815)
Operated as an academy by Board of Trustees (1816–1853)

Marshall College:
Frederick Augustus Rauch (1836–1841)
The Rev. John Williamson Nevin (1841–1853)

Franklin and Marshall College:
The Rev. Emanuel Vogel Gerhart '38 (1854–1866)
John Williamson Nevin (1866–1876)
The Rev. Thomas Gilmore Apple '50 (1877–1889)
The Rev. John Summers Stahr '67 (1889–1909)
Henry Harbaugh Apple '89 (1910–1935)
John Ahlum Schaeffer '04 (1935–1941)
H. M. J. Klein '93 (1941) (acting president)
Theodore August Distler (1941–1954)
William Webster Hall (1955–1957)
Frederick deWolf Bolman, Jr. (1957–1962)
Anthony R. Appel '35 (1962) (resigned after one week)
G. Wayne Glick (1962) (acting president)
Keith Spalding (1963–1983)
James Lawrence Powell (1983–1988)
A. Richard Kneedler '65 (1988–2002)
John Anderson Fry (2002–2010)
John Burness '67 (2010–2011) (interim president)
Daniel R. Porterfield (2011–2018)
Barbara K. Altmann (2018– )

Athletics
Sports have been an active part of Franklin and Marshall since its inception. The college's sports teams are called the Diplomats. Many of the teams compete in the Centennial Conference. Men's intercollegiate competition is in fourteen sports: baseball, basketball, cross country, football, golf, lacrosse, soccer, squash, swimming, tennis, indoor track and field, outdoor track and field, wrestling, and rowing. Women's intercollegiate competition is in fourteen sports: basketball, rowing, cross country, field hockey, golf, lacrosse, soccer, softball, squash, swimming, tennis, indoor track and field, outdoor track and field, and volleyball. F&M competes in NCAA Division III for all varsity sports except wrestling, which is Division I, and men's and women's squash, which are nondivisional.

The Franklin & Marshall Diplomats football program was first was organized in 1887 by Seminary student Miles O. Noll. Franklin and Marshall was defeated 9–0 by the York YMCA. Later that year, the program played a re-match and lost again, this time by score of 6–4. Frank Mount Pleasant became the head football coach in 1910.

Professor Charles W. Mayser founded the F&M wrestling team in 1923, and early 1924 saw the college's first wrestling match as the Blue & White defeated Western Maryland College 24–5. The Diplomat grapplers finished their maiden season with a 4–1 record. F&M wrestling competes in the EIWA and is the only Division III school to compete in Division I wrestling.

In 1992, F&M became a charter member of the Centennial Conference, an athletic conference of 11 mid-Atlantic institutions that compete in 22 sports in the NCAA's Division III. The other founding members of the conference are Bryn Mawr College, Dickinson College, Gettysburg College, Haverford College, Johns Hopkins University, Muhlenberg College, Swarthmore College, Ursinus College, Western Maryland College, (renamed McDaniel College) and Washington College.

The men's basketball team has reached the NCAA Division III Final Four on five occasions (1979, 1991, 1996, 2000, 2009), appearing in the national championship game in 1991. The men's basketball team has been nationally ranked on a frequent basis since the late 1970s, including No. 1 in Division III at some point during seven different seasons. Head coach Glenn Robinson is the career leader in wins in Division III.  Robinson has been listed as one of the top 100 college basketball coaches of all-time.

Other successful athletic teams at F&M include men's soccer, men's and women's swimming, baseball, and squash. They all traditionally compete for conference championships and have been ranked high nationally. In 2008, the men's swimming team won the Centennial Conference championships and the women's swimming team placed second. At that championship, Thomas Anthony Grabiak Jr. of F&M set Centennial Conference championship meet records in the 100 and 200 yd breaststroke events. Men's squash consistently maintains a top 20 Division I national ranking. In 1987 the men's squash team finished 15-1 and achieved a #2 national ranking led by four time all-American Morris Clothier. In 1988, the men's lacrosse team finished the season 13-3 and played in the USILA national semifinals.

Club sports
F&M also boasts several student-run clubs, most notably men's and women's rugby, both of which have become serious contenders for regional, and national championships each season and which compete in the Eastern Pennsylvania Rugby Union. Ultimate frisbee is also a popular club sport on campus, fielding both a men's and a women's team. In 2009, the college water polo team was revived and currently competes in the American Water Polo League and the Collegiate Water Polo League.

Sponaugle–Williamson Field

Sponaugle–Williamson Field is a stadium for the outdoor athletic teams of the college. It was built in 1920 as Williamson Field, named after S. Woodrow Sponaugle, who coached football and basketball and was the athletic director at F&M for 15 years. He shares the stadium's dedication with Henry S. Williamson, who was a trustee of the college from 1894 to 1917.

Shadek Stadium
Shadek Stadium is used for football and lacrosse. Construction began in the fall of 2016 and ended in the fall of 2017. The stadium was named after the Shadek family, a family prominent at the school. The turf field in the stadium, Gilburg Field, is named after football player and former F&M coach Tom Gilburg. In the first football game played in the stadium, the Diplomats defeated Centennial Conference rivals Dickinson College 56–0.

Greek system
Chi Phi, founded on December 1, 1854, remains the only fraternity at F&M with a fraternity house actually on the campus grounds. In 1929, through a special lease agreement with the college, the chapter built its house at 603 Race Avenue. The house was dedicated and opened in 1929, during the chapter's 75th anniversary celebration. During World War II, with school and fraternity attendance down, the house was converted to a temporary infirmary. In 1998, due to a series of disagreements with the college, the lease was terminated and the fraternity was evicted. On February 7, 2001, after three years, Chi Phi renegotiated a new lease with F&M. They reoccupied the house the following August.

In 1978, the school's first sorority, Sigma Sigma Sigma, was chartered. In 2005, the chapter became inactive.

In April 1988, the college's Board of Trustees voted to no longer officially recognize the school's fraternities and sororities. This was known as "derecognition." At the time, three of the school's fraternities had recently lost their national charters due to various offenses. In an effort to repair the system, the college administration proposed eight specific reforms to the Greek Council, which were ultimately rejected by all of the organizations. The result was derecognition. This was highly unpopular with the student body, but it served to remove the college from any liability associated with hazing and underage alcohol abuse, issues that were in the national public eye at that time. The Greek system continued, albeit without financial or administrative support from the college. After several years, a small number of fraternities struggled with health code violations, fires, and one accidental alcohol-related death. Owing to several factors, including dwindling financial support from fraternity and sorority alumni and legitimate concerns about student academics, health and safety, the college announced on May 19, 2004, that it would reinstate a new, revised Greek system beginning on September 1, 2004, after a 16-year absence.

As part of the new agreement between the school's Greek organizations and the administration, fraternity and sorority houses are required to submit to weekly "life safety" inspections by school officials, and inspections by the local fire department, police department, and office of public health conducted once per semester. An Inter-Fraternity Council consisting of representatives from all fraternities and advised by a member of the faculty, as well as a Greek Council consisting of members of all Greek organizations (male and female), similarly advised by a faculty member, were re-established to deal with issues facing the Greek community and advising the administration on Greek issues.

As recently as the fall of 2008, relations between the administration and the Greek system were strained. The administration placed a month-long moratorium on all Greek social events. During this period, the Interfraternity Council revised protocols governing parties, and the revisions were approved by the administration resulting in the lifting of the moratorium, but the administration committed to more sternly enforcing the newly agreed-upon rules. There were also tensions between some members of the Greek system and Lancaster City, arising chiefly from incidents of crime.

Concerns over the condition of Greek housing has led the administration and Greek organizations to examine different possibilities for improving the quality of housing options in order for such houses to receive continued support and approval from the college. In some cases, the result has been the temporary closure of Greek housing until the buildings can be brought up to school and town safety standards.

Greek life is a major part of F&M's community. As of the spring of 2014, 43.7% of the F&M student body are members of the Greek Community.

List of fraternities
 ΧΦ Chi Phi, Zeta Chapter, fall of 1854 (currently inactive)

  Phi Kappa Sigma, Zeta Chapter, October 13, 1854
  Phi Kappa Psi, Penn Eta Chapter, 1860
  Delta Tau Delta, Tau Prime Chapter, 1874–1895 (currently inactive) 
  Phi Sigma Kappa, Pi Chapter, 1903–1983 (currently inactive)
   Delta Sigma Phi, Upsilon Chapter, 1915–2015 (currently inactive)
  Lambda Chi Alpha, Alpha Theta Chapter, 1917–1980 (currently inactive)
    Sigma Pi, Nu Chapter, 1918-2017 (currently inactive)
  Phi Kappa Tau, Xi Chapter, 1921 (currently inactive) 
  Kappa Sigma, Delta Rho Chapter, 1929-2021 (currently inactive) 
  Zeta Beta Tau, Alpha Tau Chapter, 1931–1988, existed as Alpha Sigma Phi, Alpha Tau Chapter, 1996–1998, ZBT 2016–present
  Pi Lambda Phi, Tau Chapter, 1947, (currently inactive)
  Phi Sigma Pi, Zeta Beta Chapter, 2010

List of sororities
  Alpha Phi, Zeta Sigma Chapter, 1982-19xx, 2008
  Alpha Delta Pi, Theta Lambda Chapter, 2011
  Alpha Xi Delta, Iota Psi Chapter, 2014
  Chi Omega, Phi Lambda Chapter, 1987
  Kappa Delta, Eta Lambda Chapter, 2008
  Kappa Beta Gamma, Nu Chapter, 2002–2008, currently inactive
  Sigma Sigma Sigma, Delta Nu Chapter, 1978–2005, currently inactive
  Delta Sigma Theta, Lambda Gamma, 2017
  Sigma Lambda Gamma National Sorority Inc., 2019

Notable alumni

Clothing company

In 1999, a company based in Verona, Italy, began producing items of clothing in a vintage 1950s collegiate-style with the words "Franklin and Marshall" on them. F&M alumni began to report seeing F&M merchandise for sale in Europe, which puzzled the college.

In 2001, Tim McGraw posed for publicity photos wearing a "Franklin Marshall Wrestling" T-shirt, one of which was included in the CD booklet for his album Set This Circus Down.  When many asked Franklin & Marshall College about its nonexistent connection to the singer, the college investigated and discovered that the Franklin Marshall Clothing company was using its name without permission. In 2003, the college licensed the name to the company so it could sell its products, many of which omit Franklin & Marshall's ampersand, in the United States.

The clothing company has stated in news reports that its designs are "inspired by the American Vintage College spirit, as exemplified by Franklin & Marshall College." Most of its products are made in Italy and are much more expensive than the Champion-produced licensed apparel sold by the college's bookstore.  the company has stores in six cities: Athens, Dubai, Milan, Tokyo, and Paris, and also sells through high-end stores like Harrods in Britain. Although it no longer sells its products in the United States due to poor sales, in 2010 the company pledged to donate $130,000 to the college's scholarship fund.

In 2013 Franklin & Marshall became a sponsor of Hellas Verona, a football (soccer) team in the Italian Serie A.

References

External links

Official website
Official athletics website
Illinois Digital Newspaper Collections: F&M College Reporter (1964-1987)

 
1787 establishments in Pennsylvania
Educational institutions established in 1787
Benjamin Franklin
Liberal arts colleges in Pennsylvania
Sports in Lancaster, Pennsylvania
Universities and colleges in Lancaster, Pennsylvania
Eastern Pennsylvania Rugby Union
Historic districts on the National Register of Historic Places in Pennsylvania
National Register of Historic Places in Lancaster, Pennsylvania
Private universities and colleges in Pennsylvania
Robert A. M. Stern buildings